Nester Ghiro (born 4 September 1972) is a politician of Solomon Islands who served as Minister of Provincial Government and Institutional Strengthening from 1 November 2017. He has been a Member of Parliament for the constituency of Central Maikra since the 2014 general election, and was re-elected in 2019 with 70.4% of the vote.

References

Solomon Islands politicians
Members of the National Parliament of the Solomon Islands
1972 births
Living people
Fisheries and Marine Resources ministers of the Solomon Islands